Bartosz Paprocki (also Bartholomeus Paprocky or Bartholomew Paprocki, ; ca. 1540/43 in Paprocka Wola near Sierpc – 27 December 1614 in Lviv, Poland, today Ukraine) was a Polish and Czech writer, historiographer, translator, poet, heraldist and pioneer in Polish and Bohemian-Czech genealogy (often referred to as the "father of Polish and Bohemian-Czech genealogy"). Among his many historical works, are the famous publications "Gniazdo Cnoty, Zkąd Herby Rycerstwa slawnego Krolestwa Polskiego..." (The Nest of Virtues, whence the coat of arms of the Knights of the Polish Kingdom, Grand Duchy of Lithuania, Ruthenia, Prussia, Mazovia, Samogitia, and other States to the kingdom of the dukes, and lords have their genesis) in 1578 and "Herby rycerstwa polskiego" (Armorials of the Polish knighthood) in 1584. Paprocki was active in Poland until the turn of the sixteenth to seventeenth century when for political reasons he became an émigré (political exile) in Moravia and Bohemia. He is also founder of the Polish village of Bartoszowiny in Świętokrzyskie Province.

Biography
Paprocki was born in the parish of Paprocka Wola near Sierpc, Poland. He was the son of Jędrzej Paprocki and Elżbiety (Elżbieta) Jeżewska. Born into a noble family, Paprocki's family were members of the Polish nobility, who bore the Jastrzębiec Polish coat of arms.
Paprocki studied at the Jagiellonian University in Krakow, then stayed with wealthy relatives, among others. He began writing poems and soon after dedicated himself to historiography and heraldry. His works devoted to the nobility of the Polish Crown "Gniazdo Cnoty" (1578) and "Herby rycerstwa polskiego" (1584) deepened and contributed to consolidating the knowledge of the genealogy of Poland's noble families. In 1584, Bolesław I the Brave was first mentioned in a book by Paprocki.

Paprocki married Jadwiga Kossobudzka, his wife was the daughter of a castellan from Sierpc and widow of her former husband named Wisniowski. Paprocki's wife was a wealthy woman and older than Paprocki. They had no children and his marriage was unfortunate; Paprocki was tyrannized by his wife. Paprocki's unfortunate marital experience, led him to flee his home, where he remained a fierce misogynist until his death.

Summoned to Warsaw, Paprocki worked in the court of Andrzej Taranowski, who was secretary to king Sigismund II Augustus and Polish ambassador to the court of Sultan Selim II in Constantinople (Istanbul). On returning home, Paprocki learned of his wife's death, which occurred in 1572. On his return he also received the dignity of cup-bearer (Polish Podczaszy) of Dobrzyń Land, having settled there.

Between the years 1570-80 Paprocki aligned with the unfortunate political efforts of the Zborowski family, joined ranks with the Catholic Party and supported the Austrian Habsburg's candidacy of Maximilian II, Holy Roman Emperor for the Polish throne (royal election). Paprocki supported the Danzig rebellion, and in 1577 participated in the Siege of Danzig. Following the unsuccessful efforts of Maximilian III, Archduke of Austria for the Polish crown and after the victory of Sigismund III Vasa in 1588 at the Battle of Byczyna, Paprocki was forced to leave Poland and went into political exile in Moravia.

Paprocki spent 22 years in Moravia and Bohemia. He learned the Czech language and wrote alongside new poems about the history and the coat of arms of Bohemia and Moravia. He also translated the poems of Jan Kochanowski. Later he received Bohemian indygenat (nobility citizenship naturalization). He was admirer of Michał Sędziwój's (Michael Sendivogius) scientific achievements, whom he dedicated the third part of his book "Ogród królewski..." published in 1599.

In 1610 at the end of his life and stricken religious wars in the Czech lands, Paprocki returned to Poland. Destitute he lived in Wąchock and Ląd monasteries. Paprocki died suddenly on 27 December 1614 in Lviv, and was buried in a crypt at the Franciscan abbey in the city of Lviv. Paprocki is considered the father of Polish and Bohemian-Czech genealogy and a valuable source of Polish, Moravian and Bohemian-Czech heraldry. He was the author of many historical works, occasional poetry, satires, panegyrics and pamphlets.

Works

Polish
 Dziesiecioro przykazań meżowo, Kraków, 1575
 Koło rycerskie w którem rozmaite zwierzęta swe rozmowy wiodą, Kraków, 1576 (English: Knights gathering...)
 Panosza to jest wysławianie panów i paniąt ziem ruskich i podolskich, Kraków, 1575
 Historia żalosna o pratkosci i okrutnosci Tatarskiej, Kraków, 1575
 Gniazdo Cnoty, Zkąd Herby Rycerstwa slawnego Krolestwa Polskiego..., Kraków, 1578 (English: The Nest of Virtues, whence the coat of arms of the Knights of the Polish Kingdom, Grand Duchy of Lithuania, Ruthenia, Prussia, Mazovia, Samogitia, and other States to the kingdom of the dukes, and lords have their genesis)
 Krótki a prawdziwy wypis z jechania do ziemi Wołoskiej Iwana Wojewody, którego Podkową zowią, Kraków, 1578 (English: Short but True Excerpt in Coming of Iwan Wojewoda into the Land of Wallachia, Whom They Call "Horse Shoe")
 Hetman, Kraków, 1578 (English: Head Commander)
 Król, Kraków, 1578 (English: King)
 Testament starca jednego, który miał trzech synow, Kraków, 1578
 Historia barzo piekna i zalosna o Ekwanusie Krolu Skockim, Kraków, 1578
 Wesele Bogiń, Kraków, 1581 (English: Wedding Goddess)
 Herby rycerstwa polskiego na pięcioro ksiąg rozdzielone, Kraków, 1584 (English: The heraldic arms of the Polish knighthood in five volumes)
 Bartosza Paprockiego Dwie broszury polityczne z lat 1587 i 1588 (English: Two of Bartosz Paprocki' political pamphlets from year 1587 and 1588)
 Pamięć nierządu, 1588
 Nauka rozmanitych philosophów obieranie żony, Kraków, 1590 (English: The lesson of different philosophers about wife choosing...)
 Gwałt na pogany, 1595
 Próba cnót dobrych, Kraków, kolem 1595
 Ogród królewski w którym krótko opisuje historye Cesarzów, Królow Polskich i Czeskich, arcyksiążąt Austryi, książąt Ruskich, Praha, 1599 (English: Royal garden, in Which I Write Briefly About the History of Emperors, Polish and Czech Kings, Austrian Archdukes and Russian Dukes)
 Cathalogus arcybiskupów, Kraków, 1613
 Nauka i przestrogi na różne przypadki ludzkie, Kraków, 1613 (English: Lesson and a warning for different human cases...)
 Naprawa Rzeczypospoletej, Kraków, 1895
 Upominek, Kraków, 1900
 Odpowiedź, Kraków, 1910

Czech
 Zrcadlo slavného Markrabí moravského, 1593 (illustrated with woodcuts by Jan Willenberg (1571-1613). The work was originally written in Polish, translated into Czech by the Lutheran pastor Jan Wodiczko) (English: Mirror of a Famous Moravian margraviate)
 Kvalt na pohany, 1595
 Nová kratochvíle, Prague, 1579-1600
 Ecclesia, Prague, 1601
 Kšaft, Prague, 1601
 Půst tělesný, Prague, 1601
 Třinácte tabulí, Prague, 1601
 Diadochus, tj. posloupnost knížat a králů českých, biskupů a arcibiskupů pražských a všech třech stavů slavného království českého, to jest panského, rytířského a městského, Prague, 1602 (English: Diadochi, i.e. the sequence of Czech Princes and Kings, Bishops and Prague Archbishops and All Three Estates of the Famous Czech Kingdom, the Lords, Knights and Burghers)
 O valce Turecké a jiné Přibéhy: vybor z Diadochu (English: The Turkish war and other narratives: an anthology of the Diadochi)
 Obora, Prague, 1602
 Panna, zenitba, zena ve staroceskie uprave polskych skladeb Reje z Naglovic, Praha, 1602
 Historie o příbězích v království uherském, Prague, 1602
 Štambuch slezský, Brno, 1609 (English: Silesian friendship book [alba amicorum])

See also
Polish literature
Polish heraldry

External links
 Genealogy of Paprocki family

References 

Polish male writers
Polish genealogists
Polish heraldists
16th-century Polish historians
Polish male non-fiction writers
16th-century Polish nobility
Historiographers
Jagiellonian University alumni
Czech people of Polish descent
1543 births
1614 deaths
People from Sierpc County
17th-century Polish historians
17th-century Polish nobility